The Minister of Business Development and Tourism was a cabinet in the province of Manitoba, Canada.

Originally created in 1978 as the Minister of Economic Development, the position received additional responsibilities for tourism the following year, changing it to Economic Development and Tourism. It was again renamed in 1983, to Business Development and Tourism.

In 1988, the position was merged with the Industry, Trade and Technology portfolio to create the new position of Industry, Trade and Tourism.

List of Ministers of Business Development and Tourism

References 

Business Development and Tourism, Minister of